Meistersingerhalle is the municipal culture and congress centre of Nuremberg, Bavaria, Germany. It is named after the tradition of the Meistersinger (Master singers) in the town, which Wagner reflected in his opera Die Meistersinger von Nürnberg. Completed in 1963, it is a listed historic monument since 2007.

History 
Built from 1960 to 1963, the hall was inaugurated on 7 September 1963.

The great hall (Großer Saal), seating 2,100 people, has a stage and features an organ, built in 1963 by G. F. Steinmeyer & Co. The foyer is used during intermissions and for exhibitions. The hall has been used for concerts, conventions and balls. Most guest performances of classical orchestras and soloist take place in the Meistersingerhalle.

The small hall (Kleiner Saal) seats 500 people and is mostly used for chamber music concerts. Both halls are equipped with recording devices.

References

External links 

 
 

Concert halls in Germany
Buildings and structures in Nuremberg
1960s architecture